Nijolė Medvedeva (née Bluškytė; 21 October 1960 or 20 June 1960.) is a retired Lithuanian long jumper who won a bronze medal at the 1985 World Indoor Championships. She competed at the 1992 Summer Olympics, and made 4th, but was disqualified for a doping-rule violation.
Medvedeva has her personal best at 7.14 m (1988). She also competed in sprint running events at the national level.

In 1987 Medvedeva graduated from the Lithuanian University of Educational Sciences and then until 1989 worked as an instructor at the Dynamo sportclub. Since 1990s she worked in business.

References

External links
 IAAF Profile
 Results at tilastopaja.org
 Results at trackfield.brinkster.net

1960 births
Living people
People from Kelmė
Soviet female long jumpers
Lithuanian female long jumpers
Doping cases in athletics
Lithuanian sportspeople in doping cases
Athletes (track and field) at the 1992 Summer Olympics
Olympic athletes of Lithuania
World Athletics Indoor Championships medalists
Lithuanian University of Educational Sciences alumni